Sadri, also known as a Waskat or Bandi, is a vest-jacket worn by men in South Asia, while women sometimes wear a similar waistcoat known as a Koti. In Europe and America, the sadri became known as a Nehru vest.

Etymology
The word Bandi is derived from badhnati (Sanskrit: बध्नाति) meaning to fasten or to tie.

Use
The sadri is a sleeveless-vest jacket, traditionally worn over achkan, angarkha, qameez and kurta by men. It was historically worn by the peasant class and was decorated with various styles of folk embroidery for festive occasions. It is part of everyday wear for men and it is also popular among the political class throughout South Asia. In the winter, the sadri is especially worn as it keeps the wearer warm.

Koti jacket was traditionally worn by women, it differs from bandi and sadri worn by men in size and decoration. Gota embroidery is commonly used and was traditionally worn over choli, gagra choli, angarkha and shalwar kameez.

See also 

Afghan clothing
Indian clothing
Mirzai (garment)
Pakistani clothing

References 

South Asian culture
Jackets
Hindi words and phrases
Urdu-language words and phrases
Afghan clothing
Indian clothing
Pakistani clothing